Non-Zionism is the political stance of Jews who are "willing to help support Jewish settlement in Palestine... but will not come on aliyah."

The trend began in the United States in the first few decades of the 20th century when "an increasingly large section of Americanized Jewish opinion began to shift away from anti-Zionism... either to pro-Zionism or non-Zionism.... The non-Zionists were willing to offer the diaspora Jews a Jewish homeland fiscal and diplomatic counsel, not for their own benefit or spiritual comfort but for those Jews who chose to reside there."

Difference from anti-Zionists
Yoram Dinstein gave this distinction: "There is a marked difference between non-Zionism and anti-Zionism. A non-Zionist may challenge the theoretical underpinning of the concept of an 'ingathering of the exiles' in an independent Jewish State. If Jewish, he or she will not choose to live in Israel, nor will he approve or reject the notion of other Jews living there in the Jewish State of Israel... but anti-Zionists do not find it sufficient to be dissatisfied with a decision made and implemented a long time ago. They are not content with a critical assessment of the situation confined to an historical (and, accordingly, a theoretical) framework. Not merely do they have an adverse opinion about the establishment of Israel in the past, but they contest the legitimacy of Israel as a State in the present time and the future."

Contemporary definitions

Non-position
Non-Zionism has also been defined in terms of a non-position on Zionism. On online Jewish magazine Galus Australis, Anthony Frosh has defined a non-Zionist Jews as a Jew "who does not have any particular political relationship (positive or negative) with the State of Israel, or at least little more of a relationship than they would have with some other 3rd party state."

Haredi non-Zionism

Generally, those groups of Ashkenazi (Western) Haredi Jews who participate in the Israeli government but do not believe in the religious ideology of Zionism are known as "non-Zionists".  The most prominent non-Zionist Haredi group is Agudath Israel. This is in contrast to the religious Zionist Mizrachi party (which believes the State of Israel to be the beginning of the redemption); and also in contrast to the anti-Zionist Haredi groups, such as Satmar and the Edah Charedis, that openly oppose Zionism and have little to no interaction with the State of Israel and no representation in its government. Unlike the older definition, many live in the State of Israel. They tend to be extremely pro-Israel politically, as can be seen in such publications as Mishpacha and Hamodia. Sephardi Haredi Jews may refer to themselves as Zionist.

Bibliography 

 Gideon Shimoni, From Anti-Zionism to Non-Zionism in Anglo Jewry, 1917–1937, Jewish Journal of Sociology, 28 (1986), pp.19–48
 Gideon Shimoni, The Non-Zionists in Anglo Jewry, 1937–1948.
 Stuart E. Knee, “Jewish Non-Zionism in America and Palestine Commitment 1917-1941,” Jewish Social Studies 39, no. 3 (1977): 209–26.

References

External links
Bennett Muraskin, Anti-Zionism and Non-Zionism in Jewish Life—Past and Present,

Political theories
Types of Zionism